Iracoubo is a commune on the coast of French Guiana, an overseas region and department of France, located in South America.

Geography 
The settlement of Iracoubo, seat of the commune, is located between the settlement of Sinnamary and the hamlet of Organabo.

Trou Poisson, a near abandoned village is located to the south. The village has a cemetery of priests deported during the French revolution.

History 
The commune was originally settled by Amerindians near Organabo. The first settlers arrived in 1626, but were driven back. In 1765, the Galibis who had left the area for Suriname because an epidemic had broken out, returned.

In the beginning of the 19th century, Iracoubo started as a cotton plantation owned by Colonel Jacquet. In 1859, the cotton shed is donated to the community to serve as church. During the late 19th century indigenous Kalina lived along the Rococoua river in Counama and Organabo. In 1886, Father Raffray arrived in the village, and started to build the Saint Joseph's Church which opened in 1893. The church is notable for its elaborate decorations on the walls and ceiling created by Pierre Huguet, a convict of the penal colony. Saint-Joseph was declared a monument in 1978.

In 1912, the introduction of bananas and rosewood strengthened the economy which remains based on agriculture, hunting and fishing. Iracoubo is located on the Route nationale 1 connecting Saint-Laurent-du-Maroni to Cayenne.

Organabo

Organabo is a Galibi village located in the commune. As of 2020, the population is about 200 people, and consisted mainly of elderly people, because the youth had moved on to the city. The village used to be on the estuary of the Iracaoubo River facing the Atlantic Ocean, but is now several kilometres land inwards. The population primarily lives from fishing, and agriculture. In December 2018, the villagers were given communal land. The village is self sufficient, and therefore self isolated during the COVID-19 pandemic of 2020.

Nature
Crique et Pripri Yiyi is a  protected area and wetland located in the commune.

River

Iracoubo is also a river in French Guiana. The river is 160 kilometres long and flows into Atlantic Ocean.

See also
Communes of French Guiana

References

External links

 Iracoubo @ Annuaire-mairie (in French)

Communes of French Guiana